Henry George Mayes, MBE (14 February 1880 – 1928) was a British-Canadian tennis player, military figure and businessman. He won the Queen's Club Championships in 1922, 1926 and 1927.

Biography
Born in Northampton, Mayes was educated at Northampton Grammar School. He served in the Boer War in 1898, joining the Natal Horse as a trooper. He was promoted to a captain and was awarded the King's and Queen's medals.  In 1908, he resigned his commission after marrying Frances Hazard of Long Island, and moved to Winnipeg, Manitoba, Canada in 1909. There he founded a tanning company with business associates. However, he was called to military duty against with the outbreak of World War I and was a founding member of The Fort Garry Horse, serving under the Canadian forces on the Western Front from 1914 to 1916 in France, during which he was promoted from captain to major. After the war he was again promoted to lieutenant-colonel and was the head of Bayonet Fighting. His sporting expertise saw him appointed head of physical training with the Canadian Air Force and in the same position in the UK for the RAF, which saw him awarded an MBE in January 1918. He later became based in Victoria, British Columbia and London.

Mayes was a good all-round sportsman, participating in polo, tennis, and shooting on an international level. He excelled at tennis, and his hard-court play was reported to be his strongest surface and he enjoyed much popularity as a tennis player.

Mayes was on the 1913 Canadian Davis Cup team along with J. F. Foulkes, Robert Powell and Bernie Schwengers. It was Canada's first entry into the Davis Cup and they reached the final of the Cup only to be defeated by the United States in the summer of 1913 at Wimbledon where the Cup was being held. In 1926 he won the North London Championships at the Gipsy Lawn Tennis Club, Stamford Hill, London, England against Gordon Lowe. He won the Queen's Club Championships in 1922, 1926 and 1927, defeating Donald Greig 	(6–8, 6–2, 6–2, 6–1), Arthur Lowe (6–3, 6–2) and D.M. Evans (6–3, 6–3) respectively. He was also a competitor at the Wimbledon Championships. Mayes also won the Côte d'Azur Championships at Cannes, France two times (1923. 1927). Winning his last championship at the age of 47, when most modern players have long since been retired, he died just a year after his last win in London in 1928 of blood poisoning, aged 48. According to the United States Lawn Tennis Association, Mayes was reported to have still been in peak physical shape before his death, "approaching a half century".

References

External links
 Wimbledon players archive – Henry Mayes

Canadian Air Force personnel
Canadian male tennis players
Canadian Expeditionary Force officers
Deaths from sepsis
English emigrants to Canada
English male tennis players
Sportspeople from Northampton
Royal Air Force officers
British military personnel of the Second Boer War
British male tennis players
1880 births
1928 deaths
Tennis people from Northamptonshire
Members of the Order of the British Empire